Śliwice is a village in Tuchola County, Kuyavian-Pomeranian Voivodeship, in north-central Poland. It is the seat of the gmina (administrative district) called Gmina Śliwice.

The village has a population of 2,600.

References

Villages in Tuchola County